Herzberg is German for "heart mountain" and may refer to:

Places in Germany
Herzberg am Harz, a town in the Osterode district, Lower Saxony
Herzberg, Brandenburg, a town in the Elbe-Elster district, Brandenburg
Herzberg, Ostprignitz-Ruppin, a town in the Ostprignitz-Ruppin district, Brandenburg
Herzberg, Mecklenburg-Vorpommern, a town in the district of Parchim, Mecklenburg-Vorpommern
Herzberg Castle, above Herzberg am Harz, Lower Saxony

Other uses
Herzberg (surname)
3316 Herzberg, an asteroid, named after Gerhard Herzberg

See also
 Hertzberg